Gly is the amino acid glycine.

Gly or GLY may also refer to:
 "Gly" for a gigalight-year (1,000,000,000 light years), a billion light years
 Glynde railway station, a railway station in Sussex, England
 Goldsworthy Airport (IATA code: Gly), Goldsworthy, Western Australia, Australia
 ISO 639:gly, Gule language